Roy Franklin Nichols (March 3, 1896 – January 12, 1973) was an American historian, who won the 1949 Pulitzer Prize for History for The Disruption of American Democracy.

Biography
Nichols was born in Newark, New Jersey, to Franklin Coriell and Annie Cairns Nichols. His wife was the historian Jeannette Paddock Nichols (1890–1982). He graduated from Rutgers University in 1918. He completed a Master of Arts degree from Rutgers in 1919. He was a fellow at Columbia University from 1920 to 1921, and an instructor in history at Columbia from 1921 to 1925. He completed a PhD degree from Columbia in 1923. In 1925 he was appointed assistant professor of history at the University of Pennsylvania. From 1930 to 1966, he was professor of history at Pennsylvania. He also was Dean of Graduate School of Arts and Sciences (1952–66), and Vice Provost at Pennsylvania (1953–66). He was a visiting professor at Columbia (1944–45), Pitt Professor of American History and Institutions at Cambridge University (1948–49), and Stanford University (1952). In 1962 he was Fulbright lecturer in India and Japan.

He was president of Middle States Association of History Teachers (1932–33); President of the Pennsylvania Historical Association (1936-1939); President of Pennsylvania Federation of Historical Societies (1940–42); Member of Pennsylvania Historical Commission (1940–43); Member of Council, American Historical Association (1943–47); Chairman of Social Science Research Council (1949–53); President of Association of Graduate Schools of the American Association of Universities (1963–64); Vice President of American Historical Association (1964–65); President of American Historical Association (1965–66); and, Chairman of Council of Graduate Schools in the United States.

He was a Baptist.

Awards and Honorary Degrees
Nichols received Haney Medal for Literary Excellence in 1961, and Athenaeum Literary Award in 1961. He has also received a number of honorary degrees from universities such as Rutgers University and Cambridge University.

Publications
 The Democratic Machine, 1850–1854 (1923)
 Franklin Pierce: Young Hickory of the Granite Hills (1931; 2nd ed. 1958)
 The Disruption of American Democracy (1948). (1949 Pulitzer Prize for History)
 Advance Agents of American Destiny (1956)
 Religion and American Democracy (1959)
 Blueprints for Leviathan: American Style (1963)
 History in a Self-Governing Culture (1966)
 The Invention of the American Political Parties (1967)
 The Pennsylvania Historical and Museum Commission: A History  (1967)

Notes

References

External links
Roy Franklin Nichols biography
Papers of Roy Nichols at the University of Pennsylvania Libraries

1896 births
1973 deaths
Academics of the University of Cambridge
20th-century American historians
Columbia University fellows
Columbia University alumni
Columbia University faculty
Historians of the United States
Presidents of the American Historical Association
Pulitzer Prize for History winners
Rutgers University alumni
University of Pennsylvania faculty
Writers from Newark, New Jersey
20th-century American male writers
Expatriate academics in the United Kingdom
American expatriate academics
Baptists from New Jersey
Historians from New Jersey
20th-century Baptists
Fulbright alumni